Alois Petřina (1923 – 1998, Prague) was a Czechoslovak boxer. He competed for Czechoslovakia in the men's lightweight event at the 1948 Summer Olympics.

References

External links
 
 

1923 births
1998 deaths
Czechoslovak male boxers
Olympic boxers of Czechoslovakia
Boxers at the 1948 Summer Olympics
Place of birth missing
Lightweight boxers